Hải Hòa Beach is a well-known beach in Vietnam. It is at Hai Hoa Commune, Tinh Gia District, Thanh Hoa Province, around 200 km from Hanoi.

The untouched Hải Hòa Beach is a beautiful, wide and smooth white sandy beach overlooking the Gulf of Tonkin, far away is the island of Hòn Mê. To the south is Sổi Mountain and Chay Mountain.

Currently, there are four large hotels adjacent to the beach: Queen Hotel, Hotel Xanh Hà ACB, Hotel Đại Dương and Hotel Cao Nguyễn. When visiting Hải Hòa Beach, tourists may want to buy essential fish sauce, dried squid as well as dried fish and burned grilled mackerel.

Gallery

References

Beaches of Vietnam
Landforms of Thanh Hóa province
Tourist attractions in Thanh Hóa province